"Ecstasy" is a song recorded by German electronic dance music DJ ATB, for his fifth studio album  No Silence (2004). The track was released as the second single of the album  on 5 July 2004, in Germany, and on 5 October 2004 in the US.

The song is characterized by its upbeat tone, crisp layering, and memorable intro. Vocals were provided by Tiff Lacey, who is also featured in the song "Marrakech". Ecstasy is among ATB's best known songs. It samples Jocelyn Enriquez's song "A Little Bit of Ecstasy".

Track listing

Ecstasy (Germany CD single / Digital download) 
01. Ecstasy  - 3:21   
02. Ecstasy  - 3:36 
03. Ecstasy  - 5:25  
04. Ecstasy  - 6:47

Ecstasy (US Vinyl single / Promo CDr Single)
01. Ecstasy  - 5:25  
02. Ecstasy  - 3:36 
03. Ecstasy  - 6:47
04. Ecstasy  - 6:05

Ecstasy (Germany Vinyl single)
01. Ecstasy  - 5:25  
02. Ecstasy  - 6:47

Ecstasy (Italy Vinyl single)
01. Ecstasy  - 5:25  
02. Ecstasy  - 3:21  
03. Ecstasy  - 6:47
04. Ecstasy  - 3:36

Chart positions

In other Media 
 Canal 12 in Posadas, Misiones Used this as a Background song at the Top of the Hour.

References

2004 singles
ATB songs
Songs written by André Tanneberger
2004 songs
Kontor Records singles
Songs written by Bruce Elliott-Smith